Russell Howard Swan (January 3, 1964 – April 26, 2006) was an American professional baseball relief pitcher who played from 1989 through 1994 for the San Francisco Giants, Seattle Mariners and Cleveland Indians of Major League Baseball (MLB).

Listed at 6' 4", 210 lb., Swan was a southpaw reliever usually used in the set-up role, although occasionally would be called upon to work as a closer during the 1991 and 1992 campaigns. He was selected by the Giants in the ninth round of the 1986 MLB draft.

On June 9, 1990, Swan took a no-hitter into the eighth inning while starting a game for Seattle against the Detroit Tigers.

Following his playing retirement, Swan worked as a pitching coach at Washington State University and for the Colorado Rockies organization.

On April 17, 2006, Swan was found unconscious after a fall in a stairwell in Lake Havasu City, Arizona. He had been found without a wallet or any identification. Swan died nine days later at a hospital  in Las Vegas, Nevada, at the age of 42.

Sources

External links
, or Retrosheet
Pura Pelota (Venezuelan Winter League)

1964 births
2006 deaths
Accidental deaths from falls
Accidental deaths in Arizona
Accidental deaths in Nevada
Amarillo Dillas players
American expatriate baseball players in Canada
Baseball coaches from California
Baseball players from California
Calgary Cannons players
Charlotte Knights players
Cleveland Indians players
Clinton Giants players
Edmonton Trappers players
Everett Giants players
Fresno Giants players
Las Vegas Stars (baseball) players
Major League Baseball pitchers
Minor league baseball coaches
People from Fremont, California
Phoenix Firebirds players
San Francisco Giants players
San Jose Giants players
Seattle Mariners players
Spokane Falls Bigfoot baseball players
Shreveport Captains players
Texas A&M Aggies baseball players
Texas A&M University alumni
Tigres de Aragua players
American expatriate baseball players in Venezuela
Washington State Cougars baseball coaches